Taiwan has been controlled by various governments and has been associated with various flags throughout its history. Since 1945, the Republic of China controls the island; thus the flag most commonly associated with it is the Flag of the Republic of China. 

The first national flag of Taiwan was first used in 1663 during the Kingdom of Tungning, which had a plain white flag with the character 「鄭」 (zhèng) on the red bordered circle. The flag of the Qing dynasty was also used from 1862 until 1895, when the Republic of Formosa was declared. The Formosan flag had a tiger on a plain blue filed with azure clouds below it.

During Japanese rule of Taiwan, the flag of Japan was flown in the island from 1895 to 1945. 

Following the transfer of Taiwan from Japan to China in 1945, the national flag was specified in Article Six of the 1947 Constitution of the Republic of China. After the Chinese Civil War in 1949, the government of Chiang Kai-shek relocated the Republic of China (ROC) to the island of Taiwan.

Current flag

Historical flags

Royal flags

Political divisions

Below are the flags used in the political divisions of Taiwan.

Provinces

Special municipalities

Provincial cities

Counties

Military flags

Other state flags

Political party flags

Chinese Taipei sports flags

Other historical flags

See also
 List of Chinese flags
 Proposed flags of Taiwan

References

Taiwan
Flags
Taiwanese